David Albertus Trelawney Knijnenburg (born 3 April 1967) is an Australian stage, television and film actor, best known for playing Alfred Hitchcock in his stage production Hitchcock & Herrmann and in assorted roles in Twelfth Night Theatre's numerous stage adaptations of classic BBC television series such as Dad's Army and 'Allo 'Allo!. He is notable for his height – he is two metres (six-foot seven inches) tall.

He was one of dozens of names mentioned during the media speculation over the casting of the eleventh Doctor Who after David Tennant announced his resignation.

Born into a theatrical family of Dutch descent (his mother was actress and model Jann Freeman), Knijnenburg began his career at the World Exposition of 1988 as a television presenter hosting a live show for NHK Japan – Japanese Television. He has performed on stage alongside Lucky Grills, Gorden Kaye, Sue Hodge, Guy Siner, Katy Manning, Jason Gann, Chloe Dallimore, Steven Tandy, Jon English, Lewis Fiander and Tony Bonner.

Filmography

Television

Theatre

Awards and nominations

In 2007 David was the voted "Best Dressed Male" for Style Magazine's Melbourne Cup Fashions on the Field.

Stage awards

1999 – Won – Harveys Award for The Importance of Being Earnest
2000 – Nominated – 4MBS Perform Award for Best Actor in a Drama for Whodunnit
2001 – Nominated – 4MBS Perform Award for Best Actor in a Drama for Agatha Christie's Murder on the Nile
2001 – Nominated – 4MBS Perform Award for Best Actor in a Musical for Oliver!, My Fair Lady and Joseph and the Amazing Technicolor Dreamcoat
2003 – Won – The Glugs of Gosh Award for Excellence in Theatre
2003 – Nominated – Matilda Award for Emerging Artist
2006 – Nominated – Matilda Award for Best Playwright Hitchcock & Herrmann

References

External links 

David Knijnenburg at Austage
David Knijnenburg Image Search
Matilda Awards 2005
ABC Radio Review of Hitchcock & Herrmann
Melbourne's THE AGE Review of Hitchcock & Herrmann
The Groggy Squirrel Review of Hitchcock & Herrmann
Melbourne Stage Online Review of Hitchcock & Herrmann

1967 births
Australian male film actors
Australian people of Dutch descent
Australian male stage actors
Australian male television actors
Living people
Male actors from Brisbane